Joseph F. Simmons (June 5, 1895 – March 4, 1973) was an American football, basketball, and baseball coach.  He served as the head football coach at Central Michigan University for one season in 1920, compiling a record of 4–3–1.  He was also the head basketball and head baseball coach at Central Michigan during the same academic year.  Simmons graduated from Carthage College, where played football, basketball, and baseball, and ran track.  He coached high school football at South Milwaukee High School in the late 1920s and at Milwaukee Country Day School from 1928 to 1936.  He was an assistant football coach at Yale University from 1937 to 1939.

Head coaching record

College football

References

1895 births
1973 deaths
American men's basketball players
Basketball coaches from Wisconsin
Basketball players from Wisconsin
Carthage Firebirds baseball players
Carthage Firebirds men's basketball players
Carthage Firebirds football players
Central Michigan Chippewas baseball coaches
Central Michigan Chippewas football coaches
Central Michigan Chippewas men's basketball coaches
College men's basketball head coaches in the United States
Yale Bulldogs football coaches
College men's track and field athletes in the United States
High school football coaches in Wisconsin
Sportspeople from Milwaukee
Players of American football from Milwaukee
Coaches of American football from Wisconsin
Baseball coaches from Wisconsin
Baseball players from Wisconsin